BNS Bishkhali (formerly known as PNS Jessore) was a large patrol craft (LPC) of Bangladesh Navy. The ship joined the Bangladesh Navy fleet after Bangladesh Liberation War.

History
During the liberation war of 1971, the naval commandos of Bangladesh sunk the Pakistan Navy Ship 'PNS Jessore'. After the war, the ship was salvaged and extensively repaired at Khulna Shipyard. Then it was commissioned in Bangladesh Navy as BNS Bishkhali on 23 November 1978.

Career

During the service period, the ship served at Khulna under Commodore Commanding BN Khulna (COMKHUL). After serving for around 36 years, on 20 May 2014, she was decommissioned from the Bangladesh Navy. She was decommissioned at Digraj naval base in Mongla, Khulna due to operational limitations.

Armament

The Ship was armed with two Breda 40 mm / 70 gun which can fire at a rate of 300 rds / min to a distance 12.5 km (6.8 n miles)

References

See also
List of historic ships of the Bangladesh Navy
Bangladesh Navy

Decommissioned ships of the Bangladesh Navy